Bob and Mike Bryan successfully defended their title by defeating Simone Bolelli and Fabio Fognini in the final, 7–6(7–3), 6–1.

Seeds
All seeds receive a bye into the second round.

Draw

Finals

Top half

Bottom half

References
 Main Draw

Doubles